Patrick Robinson (born 6 November 1963) is a British actor best known for his work in the long-running medical drama series Casualty on BBC One.  In the early years of the show, he played first a staff nurse and later a charge nurse; in later years, he played Consultant Martin "Ash" Ashford.

Early life
Robinson was the fifth of seven children born to a Jamaican-immigrant electrician father and his English-born wife. Robinson joined the South East London School Drama Group aged 14. The cousin of footballer and TV personality Ian Wright, Robinson was offered a trial at Southampton F.C., which he turned down to attend additional drama classes.

After studying architecture for a year, he left to join the Robert Stigwood organisation as a messenger boy. He then graduated from the London Academy of Music and Dramatic Art.

Career
On graduation he started his career in theatre, and then joined the Royal Shakespeare Company, spending two seasons in Stratford-upon-Avon and then two in London.

Robinson left the RSC to join the cast of Casualty as the character Martin "Ash" Ashford, a nurse, beginning in 1990. He left the series but returned in 2013-14 to reprise the Ashford role as a Consultant. He returned to Casualty in 2016 as part of the anniversary celebrations.

Robinson played CIA agent Leon Washington in the 2003 action film Belly of the Beast, alongside Steven Seagal.

He appeared in an episode in the last series of the popular CBBC drama The Story of Tracy Beaker (TV Series) as Crash Daniels's abusive father Theo.

In late 2007, he played former slave Thomas Peters who went on to become a leader in Sierra Leone, in a stage adaptation of Rough Crossings by historian Simon Schama at the Liverpool Playhouse.

From 2008 he appeared as Detective Constable Jacob Banks in the ITV police drama The Bill. In 2009 he participated in Let's Dance for Comic Relief with Lisa Maxwell dancing a routine based on Riverdance.

In March 2011, he was appearing as a German cavalry officer 'Friedrich' in the New London Theatre production of War Horse.

In 2013, Patrick participated in the eleventh series of Strictly Come Dancing. His dance partner was Anya Garnis, a new professional dancer that year. They were voted out in the semi-final.  He played Gregory Brantner in Schooled for Murder, a two part episode of Midsomer Murders (2013, S15). In September 2015, he joined series 5 of Sky 1's Mount Pleasant as Policeman Cameron Miller, and returned for series 6 in September 2016. 
In March 2020 he played Marcus Ormansby, a novelist, in “The Trouble with Maggie Cole” an ITV drama with Dawn French.
In June 2020 Patrick played Anthony Bryan in “Sitting in Limbo”, a feature-length factual BBC One drama about the Windrush scandal. In January 2021, he guest starred in Death in Paradise (S10:E1) as TV host Garfield Tourné.
He played Father Benedict in Season 5 of The Last Kingdom, in 2022.

Personal life
Married, the couple have three daughters and one son.   The family lives in Stratford-upon-Avon.

A supporter of football club Arsenal F.C., where his cousin Ian Wright played, Robinson has played regularly for the club's ex-pro and celebrity team. He also plays street hockey with the Ashmead Cruisers, a team that he co-founded in 1980. The team was the runner-up in the national street hockey tournament twice in the 1980s.

References

External links
Official website

Patrick Robinson at Biogs.com

1963 births
Living people
Alumni of the London Academy of Music and Dramatic Art
Male actors from London
English male stage actors
English male television actors
Royal Shakespeare Company members
Black British male actors
English people of Jamaican descent